A free lunch is a meal offered as a sales enticement.

Free Lunch may also refer to:

Literature
 Free Lunch: How the Wealthiest Americans Enrich Themselves at Government Expense and Stick You With The Bill, a 2007 nonfiction book by David Cay Johnston
 The Free Lunch, a 2001 novel by Spider Robinson
 Free Lunch (book), a 2019 nonfiction book by Rex Ogle

Other uses
 National School Lunch Program, a United States government program
 There ain't no such thing as a free lunch, an economic concept